Headless Cross railway station or Headlesscross railway station was a station on the Wilsontown, Morningside and Coltness Railway (WM&CR) that served the rural area of Headless Cross near Fauldhouse in West Lothian. The station was located 4 miles 60 chains east of Morningside railway station.

The company at first adopted the standard track gauge for mineral lines of 4 ft 6 in, often referred to as Scotch gauge. The Edinburgh and Glasgow Railway took over the WM&CR in 1849, the track gauge already having been changed in August 1847, from the now almost obsolete 4 ft 6 in to the generally accepted standard gauge of 4 ft 8½ in.

Headless Cross station had a single short platform that was accessed off the B715 Headlesscross Road and stood just to the west of the old railway overbridge.

Services

The line was worked by steam although the early intention may have been to work the line as a horse drawn waggonway with independent hauliers.

Sporadic passenger services had started from 1845 and a road coach ran between Edinburgh to the original terminus at Longridge from 16 May 1846, passengers disembarking travelling on by train to Townhead. In 1847 two hours was the railway section of the journey, calling at all the stations on the Wilsontown line.

The Caledonian Railway opened its line from Carlisle to Garriongill Junction in 1848 and its trains then ran through to Glasgow over the WM&CR. The demands on the line's capacity may led to the WM&CR passenger service being terminated at this time before being reinstated for a short time a few years later.

The passenger service on the line restarted On 1 October 1864 between Morningside and Bathgate on the 1850 extension, with intermediate stations only however at Blackhall, Crofthead, Bents and Whitburn.

Station site infrastructure
The OS map shows the station site located near the Stane to Fauldhouse road on Headlesscross Road (B715) with an access lane, no clear indication of a platform and no goods yard or signalling. A small square structure was located near to the railway bridge over the road in 1896–97. The WMCR stations had no waiting rooms or shelters.

The 1910 OS map shows the small square structure at the station's site with two signals and a set of points leading to a double track passing loop section with a signal box on the southern side. A footpath runs from the entrance off Headlesscross Road and ran parallel to the track to Knowton Colliery. By 1940 the square structure had been removed.

A short tramway, dismantled by 1895, ran up from next to the Lingore Linn and terminated near the old station site.

References
Notes

Sources

Cobb, M.H. (2003). The Railways of Great Britain -- A Historical Atlas. Shepperton : Ian Allan Publishing Limited. .
Thomas, John (1984) revised J S Paterson, A Regional History of the Railways of Great Britain: Volume 6, Scotland, the Lowlands and the Borders, Newton Abbott : David and Charles. .

Railway stations in Great Britain opened in 1847
Railway stations in Great Britain closed in 1848
Railway stations in Great Britain opened in 1850
Railway stations in Great Britain closed in 1852
Disused railway stations in West Lothian
1845 establishments in Scotland
Transport in West Lothian